Greenford is an unincorporated community in central Green Township, Mahoning County, Ohio, United States. The community lies along State Route 165 a short distance north of Salem. It is part of the Youngstown–Warren metropolitan area. 

Greenford has a post office with the ZIP code 44422, in operation since 1829. The community takes its name from Green Township. Greenford has a public library, a branch of the Public Library of Youngstown and Mahoning County.

History
Greenford is the largest community in Green Township. The area was first settled by people of German ancestry in the early 1800s. In its formation, Green Township and the area surrounding Greenford had been a series of farms and coal mines. As the population grew, schools and churches were built throughout the community.

Schools
In 1844, there were 12 schools throughout the entire township, and multiple churches serving different denominations. Greenford High School would later form with North Lima High School in 1969 to form what is now South Range High School. The old Greenford High School had been used as the Middle School for South Range, until 2010 when the new K-12 campus in Canfield opened.

Politics
In the Ohio General Assembly, Greenford is located in the 33rd Senate District, represented by Michael Rulli (R), and in the 59th State Representative District, represented by Alessandro Cutrona (R).

Notable person
Ty Votaw, former LPGA Tour commissioner

References

Unincorporated communities in Mahoning County, Ohio
1829 establishments in Ohio
Populated places established in 1829
Unincorporated communities in Ohio